USS Cape Cod (AD-43) was the third  in the United States Navy.

History
Cape Cod was laid down on 27 January 1979 at San Diego, California, by the National Steel and Shipbuilding Company and launched on 2 August 1980. The destroyer tender worked for many years in active naval service. It assisted the s, the s and s.

She was commissioned on 17 April 1982 and served 13 years as a destroyer tender before being decommissioned on 29 September 1995, and stricken from the Navy list on 7 April 1999. She was berthed at the James River Reserve Fleet in Fort Eustis, VA, until she was sold for scrap in 2012.

See also

External links
 http://gallery.linuxguru.net/uss-cape-cod-ad43
 http://www.navsource.org/archives/09/03/0343.htm
 http://www.globalsecurity.org/military/systems/ship/ad-41.htm

References

 

 

Cold War auxiliary ships of the United States
Yellowstone-class destroyer tenders
1980 ships
Ships built in San Diego
Tenders of the United States Navy
Destroyer tenders of the United States